Friedrich Salzer (1 June 1827, Heilbronn - 14 May 1876, Heilbronn) was a German landscape painter. He specialized in winter scenes and forest views.

Biography 
His father, Johann Jakob Salzer (1798–1879) came from Dettingen an der Erms to open a paint store, which eventually became a paint factory. He was born to his father's first wife, Elisabeth. After becoming a widower in 1860, his father married again, to the much younger Caroline Haas, who gave birth to his half-brother, a publisher of evangelical literature.

He initially worked in his father's paint factory, while taking lessons from a local artist named Karl Baumann. In 1846, upon Baumann's recommendation, he moved to Munich to continue his artistic training and began his studies with the Tyrolean painter, Joseph Anton Rhomberg, who had been a Professor in Munich since 1827. His circle of friends there included Carl Ebert, Richard Zimmermann, who influenced his style, and Alexander von Kotzebue, a battle painter for whom he provided some landscape backgrounds.

In 1863, he returned to Heilbronn and married Emilie von Lobstein, with whom he had four sons. After his father's retirement, he took over management of the paint factory. That, coupled with increasingly  poor health, left him little time for painting during the last decade of his life.

References

Further reading 
 "Salzer, Friedrich". In: Hans Vollmer (Ed.): Allgemeines Lexikon der Bildenden Künstler von der Antike bis zur Gegenwart, Vol. 29: Rosa–Scheffauer. E. A. Seemann, Leipzig 1935, pg.370
 Gert Nagel: Schwäbisches Künstlerlexikon: vom Barock bis zur Gegenwart., Kunst und Antiquitäten, Munich 1986, pg.101

External links 

1827 births
1876 deaths
19th-century German painters
19th-century German male artists
German landscape painters
People from Heilbronn